The Women's doubles Squash event at the 2018 Commonwealth Games was held at the Oxenford Studios, Gold Coast from 10 to 15 April.

Medalists

Seeds

  (gold medal)
  (quarterfinals)
  (silver medal)
  (bronze medal)
  (quarterfinals)
  (quarterfinals)
  (fourth place)
  (group stage)
  (quarterfinals)
  (group stage)
  (group stage)
  (group stage)

Finals

Group stage

Pool A

Pool B

Pool C

Pool D

References

Squash at the 2018 Commonwealth Games
Common